North-Wright Airways or North Wright Air is an airline based in Norman Wells, Northwest Territories, Canada. It operates commuter services to several communities in the Northwest Territories, and charter services. Its main base is Norman Wells Airport and they operate the Norman Wells Water Aerodrome.

History 
The airline was established in 1986 and used to be known since 1979 as Nahanni Air Services and North Wright Air.

Destinations
As of November 2021, North-Wright Airways served the following destinations:

Aklavik (seasonal, Aklavik/Freddie Carmichael Airport)
Colville Lake (Colville Lake/Tommy Kochon Aerodrome)
Deline (Déline Airport)
Fort Good Hope (Fort Good Hope Airport)
Inuvik (Inuvik (Mike Zubko) Airport)
Norman Wells (Norman Wells Airport)
Tulita (Tulita Airport)
Yellowknife (Yellowknife Airport)

Fleet 
As of November 2021, North-Wright operates 10+ aircraft and has 18 registered with Transport Canada:

Accidents
On 5 July 2004, a Twin Otter, C-FMOL, was departing a  gravel runway just off the Canol Road west of Norman Wells. As they took off the aircraft was caught by a sudden crosswind and returned to the runway where the left wheel caught some willows that were growing onto the strip. The aircraft went off the end of the strip and the wing became detached. No one was killed or injured

On 14 September 2005, a Cessna 207, C-FAWL, left Tulita Airport for Norman Wells. About  the aircraft, with one pilot and two passengers, went down into the muskeg and flipped over. The passengers were uninjured but the pilot had serious injuries.

On 16 August 2006, a Cessna 337, C-FWHP, was flying from Fort Good Hope Airport to Norman Wells with one pilot and five passengers. the aircraft went overdue and a search was begun. All passengers and the pilot were killed.

On 16 July 2008, a Twin Otter was on final for Hook Lake when the aircraft stalled. The aircraft hit some trees near the shore of the lake but neither pilot was injured.

On 20 May 2010, the wing of a Cessna 207, that was flying  at a low altitude at Fort Good Hope Airport hit another North-Wright pilot. The pilot on the ground, William Bleach, who was filming at the time, died three days later. Parker James Butterfield, who was flying the C207, was sentenced to nine months and suspended from flying for two years.

References

External links 

North-Wright Airways

Charter airlines of Canada
Airlines established in 1986
Regional airlines of the Northwest Territories
1986 establishments in the Northwest Territories
Seaplane operators